Hart Matthew Bochner (born October 3, 1956) is a Canadian actor, film director, screenwriter and producer. He has appeared in films such as Breaking Away (1979), Terror Train (1980), Rich and Famous (1981), The Wild Life (1984), Making Mr. Right (1987), Die Hard (1988), Apartment Zero (1988), Mr. Destiny (1990), Mad at the Moon (1992), Break Up (1998), Liberty Stands Still (2002) and Spread (2009). On television, he has starred in War and Remembrance (1988–89), Children of the Dust (1995), Baby for Sale (2004), The Starter Wife (2008) and Scandal (2015).

Early life
Bochner was born in Toronto, Ontario, the son of Ruth (née Roher; 1925-2017), a concert pianist, and actor Lloyd Bochner. His family is Jewish. Bochner is a board member of the Environmental Media Awards. His grand-uncle was journalist, lawyer and philanthropist Isaiah L. Kenen.

Career
Bochner appeared in such films as Islands in the Stream (1977), Breaking Away (1979), Terror Train (1980), Rich and Famous (1981), Supergirl (1984), Apartment Zero (1988),  Die Hard (1988), Mr. Destiny and Fellow Traveller (1989). In the late 1990s, Bochner had a voice role in Batman: Mask of the Phantasm (1993) and starred opposite Susan Sarandon in Anywhere But Here (1999). He also appeared in the films Urban Legends: Final Cut (2000), and Say Nothing (2001). Bochner had an uncredited role in the 2013 remake of Carrie.

On television, Bochner had a key role as Byron Henry in the 1988 ABC miniseries War and Remembrance. More recently, he starred as Zach, the boyfriend of Molly Kagan (Debra Messing), on USA Network's short-lived series The Starter Wife (2008).

Among the films he has directed are PCU (1994), High School High (1996), and Just Add Water (2008).

Filmography

Film

Television

References

External links

Hart Bochner(Aveleyman)

1956 births
Living people
Canadian male film actors
Film producers from Ontario
Jewish Canadian writers
Canadian male screenwriters
Canadian male television actors
Canadian male voice actors
Jewish Canadian male actors
Male actors from Toronto
Film directors from Toronto
Writers from Toronto
21st-century Canadian male actors
20th-century Canadian male actors
Canadian people of Russian-Jewish descent
Jewish Canadian filmmakers
20th-century Canadian screenwriters
20th-century Canadian male writers
21st-century Canadian screenwriters
21st-century Canadian male writers